Takuya Satō may refer to:

, Japanese anime screenwriter and director
, Japanese footballer
, Japanese voice actor

See also
 Takuma Sato (1977), Japanese professional racing driver